Caulerpa webbiana, commonly known as bottlebrush green seaweed, is a species of seaweed in the family Caulerpaceae.

The seaweed has an olive green to bright green thallus that spreads outward to around  forming dense clumps on coral rubble among seagrasses.

The species was first formally described in 1837 by the botanist Camille Montagne as part of the work Centurie de plantes cellulaires exotiques nouvelles as published in Annales des Sciences Naturelles, Botanique, Seconde série. The only known synonym is Chauvinia webbiana as described by Friedrich Traugott Kützing in 1849. The type specimen was collected from around Lanzarote in the Canary Islands.

The species is found in warmer waters in sediment or in coral reefs. It is found around the Canary Islands, islands in the Caribbean and Hawaii. It is also found is parts of Asia including Singapore. In Western Australia, it is found along the coast in the Kimberley region extending south to the Houtman Abrolhos.

References

webbiana
Plants described in 1837
Algae of Australia
Algae of Hawaii